KAJN-FM is a Contemporary Christian formatted broadcast radio station licensed to Crowley, Louisiana, serving South-Central Louisiana.  KAJN-FM is owned and operated by Agape Broadcasters, Inc.

On August 31, 2018, a small airplane crashed into the station's transmitter tower, collapsing it, knocking the station off the air temporarily, and killing two on board the plane.

References

External links
 102.9FM KAJN Online
 

1977 establishments in Louisiana
Contemporary Christian radio stations in the United States
Radio stations established in 1977
Christian radio stations in Louisiana